Michal Nowosadzki is a Polish professional bridge player. Representing Poland, Nowosadzki won the 2015 and 2019 Bermuda Bowl. Nowosadzki is a World Grand Master and as of July 2020, ranked fifth in the world by the World Bridge Federation. His regular partner is Jacek Kalita.  In July 2020, he admitted to cheating online by looking at all four hands "self-kibitzing".

Bridge accomplishments

Wins
 Bermuda Bowl (2) 2015, 2019
 North American Bridge Championships (7)
 Spingold (2) 2013, 2019
 Jacoby Open Swiss Teams (1) 2018
 Reisinger (1) 2018
 Mitchell Board-a-Match Teams (2) 2014, 2016
 Keohane North American Swiss Teams (1) 2015

Runners-up
 North American Bridge Championships (4)
 Roth Open Swiss Teams (1) 2016
 Reisinger (1) 2019
 Keohane North American Swiss Teams (2) 2014, 2016

References

External links
 Confession at Bridge Winners
 Profile at Bridge Winners

Polish contract bridge players
Living people
Place of birth missing (living people)
Year of birth missing (living people)